Charles M. Seay (1867–1944) was an American film director, scriptwriter, and actor. He was employed by the Edison Manufacturing Company, and directed over 80 short films.

He was cast along with a couple of other film directors in the Broadway musical comedy about the film industry The Squab Farm.

Partial filmography
 Pigs Is Pigs (1910)
 The Child and the Tramp (1911)
 Edna's Imprisonment (1911)
 The Adventure of the Wrong Santa Claus (1914) (director)
 Blue Grass (1915) (director)

References

External links

 

1867 births
1944 deaths
Year of death unknown
American film directors
Silent film directors